Tobias Wendl (born 16 June 1987) is a German luger who has competed since 1993, acting as a front. He won a silver medal in the men's doubles event at the 2008 FIL World Luge Championships in Oberhof, Germany, a silver and a bronze at the FIL European Luge Championships 2010 in Sigulda, a gold at the FIL World Luge Championships 2013, and two gold medals at his debut Winter Olympics at the 2014 Winter Olympics in Sochi. He is also a Master Sergeant in the German Army.

Biography
Wendl was born on 16 June 1987 in Aachen, Germany. He began competing in the luge in 1993; and became a part of the national team in 2005, luging as a front. At the 2008 FIL World Luge Championships in Oberhof, Germany, he won a silver medal; and at the FIL European Luge Championships 2010 in Sigulda, Wendl won a silver medal in men's doubles and a bronze medal in the mixed team events. He won a gold medal at the FIL World Luge Championships 2013, in Whistler, Canada. Wendl competes in the double with Tobias Arlt, and is the front. Their nickname when competing together is "The Bayern-Express" and "The Two Tobis".

He is also a Master Sergeant in the German Army.

Olympics
Wendl won two gold medals at the 2014 Winter Olympics in Sochi; in the luge double with Tobias Arlt, he won a gold in a time of 1 minute and 38:933 seconds at the Sanki Sliding track: this was half a second ahead of the second-placed Andreas Linger and Wolfgang Linger of Austria; this winning margin was the biggest ever in Olympic luge doubles. In the pair's first run, they set a track record of 49.373 seconds.

Wendl then won the team relay with Felix Loch, Natalie Geisenberger, and Tobias Arlt; finishing more than one full second ahead of the second-placed Russian Federation, in a time of 2 minutes and 45.649 seconds.

Luge results
All results are sourced from the International Luge Federation (FIL) and German Bobsleigh, Luge and Skeleton Federation (BSD).

World Cup

See also
List of multiple Olympic gold medalists

References

External links

1987 births
German male lugers
Living people
Lugers at the 2014 Winter Olympics
Lugers at the 2018 Winter Olympics
Lugers at the 2022 Winter Olympics
Olympic lugers of Germany
Olympic gold medalists for Germany
Olympic medalists in luge
Medalists at the 2014 Winter Olympics
Medalists at the 2018 Winter Olympics
Medalists at the 2022 Winter Olympics
Sportspeople from Aachen
21st-century German people